Get Us out of Here is the second and final studio album by Freur and was released in the Netherlands and Germany in 1986. The cassette version of the album included five extra tracks.

CD release
The album was unavailable on CD until 2009 when Cherry Red Records released Get Us out of Here/Doot-Doot, which includes both Freur albums on one CD. In order to fit both albums onto one CD over two minutes of music has been removed from Get Us out of Here; with the tracks "Emeralds and Pearls", "The Devil and Darkness", "The Piano Song", "Happiness" and "Endless Groove" all being faded out prematurely.

Track listing
All songs written and composed by Karl Hyde, Rick Smith and Alfie Thomas, except where noted.

CBS Records LP: CBS 26328

CBS Records Cassette: 40-26328

2009 – Cherry Red Records CD: CDM RED 419*

* Tracks 11–20 taken from the album Doot-Doot

Personnel

Musicians
Karl Hyde – Vocals, guitar
Bryn Burrows – Drums
Rick Smith – Keyboards
Alfie Thomas – Bass, keyboards 
John Warwicker – Keyboards

Additional musicians
Mr. Bowie – Fretless bass 
Andy Sheppard – Tenor saxophone and soprano saxophone

Production
Produced by Freur and John Hudson
"Jazz Is King?", "Major Motion", "This Is the Way" and "Get Us Out Of Here" produced by Freur

References

1986 albums
Freur albums
CBS Records albums